The Accidental Sorcerer is the first book in the Rogue Agent series by Australian writer Karen Miller.

Synopsis
The Accidental Sorcerer follows haphazard wizard Gerald Dunwoody as he begins his employment as Royal Court Wizard to King Lional of New Ottosland, mentored by his friend Monk. Gerald takes the job reluctantly, and soon discovers that the King may not have his best interest in mind.

Publication
The Accidental Sorcerer was published in September 2008 by Voyager Books, an imprint of HarperCollins.

Response
Publishers Weekly called it "droll" and "whimsical". SF Site praised it for mixing humor with more serious themes but SFF World felt the combination did not work. A reviewer for the Herald Sun described the work as a "Harry Potter for grown-ups tale". In The Dominion Post, Morris noted that it reads "almost" as "fantasy satire".

References

External links
 The Accidental Sorcerer at karenmiller.net

2008 novels
Novels by Karen Miller